The Ruston State Bank, also known as the Ruston State Bank and Trust Company, is a historic institutional building located at 107 North Trenton Street in Ruston, Louisiana.

Built in 1910, the two-story masonry structure is decorated in Beaux Arts style. The building features a stone facade combining the idea of a Roman triumphal arch with that of a temple front. A clock was installed on the facade in 1927. 

The building was listed on the National Register of Historic Places on November 2, 1990.

See also
 National Register of Historic Places listings in Lincoln Parish, Louisiana
 Downtown Ruston Historic District

References

Buildings and structures on the National Register of Historic Places in Louisiana
Commercial buildings completed in 1910
Beaux-Arts architecture in Louisiana
Lincoln Parish, Louisiana
National Register of Historic Places in Lincoln Parish, Louisiana